Clendening is a surname. Notable people with the surname include:

Adam Clendening (born 1992), American ice hockey player
Derek Clendening (born 1981), Canadian writer
Judy Clendening, Canadian judge
Logan Clendening (1884–1945), American physician and medical writer
Robert J. Clendening (1914–1982), American politician